Merzomyia licenti is a species of tephritid or fruit flies in the genus Merzomyia of the family Tephritidae.

Distribution
China, Russia.

References

Tephritinae
Insects described in 1938
Diptera of Asia